This is a list of butterflies of Lesotho. About 93 species are known from Lesotho, one of which, Torynesis pringlei, is endemic.

Papilionidae

Papilioninae

Papilionini
Papilio demodocus Esper, [1798]

Pieridae

Coliadinae
Eurema brigitta (Stoll, [1780])
Eurema hecabe solifera (Butler, 1875)
Catopsilia florella (Fabricius, 1775)
Colias electo (Linnaeus, 1763)

Pierinae
Colotis euippe omphale (Godart, 1819)
Colotis evenina (Wallengren, 1857)

Pierini
Pontia helice (Linnaeus, 1764)
Belenois aurota (Fabricius, 1793)

Lycaenidae

Miletinae

Miletini
Thestor basutus (Wallengren, 1857)

Aphnaeinae
Chrysoritis chrysaor (Trimen, 1864)
Chrysoritis turneri amatola (Dickson & McMaster, 1967)
Chrysoritis pelion (Pennington, 1953)
Cigaritis mozambica (Bertoloni, 1850)
Aloeides aranda (Wallengren, 1857)
Aloeides henningi Tite & Dickson, 1973
Aloeides pierus (Cramer, 1779)
Aloeides maluti Pringle, 1983
Aloeides trimeni Tite & Dickson, 1973
Aloeides molomo (Trimen, 1870)
Aloeides taikosama (Wallengren, 1857)
Aloeides oreas Tite & Dickson, 1968
Aloeides dentatis maseruna (Riley, 1938)
Aloeides rileyi Tite & Dickson, 1976
Aloeides braueri Tite & Dickson, 1968

Theclinae
Leptomyrina hirundo (Wallengren, 1857)
Leptomyrina lara (Linnaeus, 1764)

Polyommatinae

Lycaenesthini
Anthene butleri livida (Trimen, 1881)
Lycaena clarki Clark & Dickson, 1971

Polyommatini
Cupidopsis cissus (Godart, [1824])
Cupidopsis jobates (Hopffer, 1855)
Lampides boeticus (Linnaeus, 1767)
Cacyreus lingeus (Stoll, 1782)
Cacyreus tespis (Herbst, 1804)
Harpendyreus tsomo (Trimen, 1868)
Zizeeria knysna (Trimen, 1862)
Actizera lucida (Trimen, 1883)
Zizula hylax (Fabricius, 1775)
Oraidium barberae (Trimen, 1868)
Azanus jesous (Guérin-Méneville, 1849)
Azanus moriqua (Wallengren, 1857)
Azanus ubaldus (Stoll, 1782)
Eicochrysops messapus messapus (Godart, 1824)
Eicochrysops messapus mahallakoaena (Wallengren, 1857)
Orachrysops nasutus remus Henning & Henning, 1994
Freyeria trochylus (Freyer, [1843])
Lepidochrysops lerothodi (Trimen, 1904)
Lepidochrysops letsea (Trimen, 1870)
Lepidochrysops loewensteini (Swanepoel, 1951)
Lepidochrysops oosthuizeni  Swanepoel & Vári, 1983
Lepidochrysops ortygia (Trimen & Bowker, 1887)
Lepidochrysops patricia (Trimen & Bowker, 1887)
Lepidochrysops variabilis Cottrell, 1965

Nymphalidae

Danainae

Danaini
Danaus chrysippus orientis (Aurivillius, 1909)

Satyrinae

Melanitini
Aeropetes tulbaghia (Linnaeus, 1764)

Satyrini
Neita lotenia (van Son, 1949)
Pseudonympha magoides van Son, 1955
Pseudonympha varii van Son, 1955
Pseudonympha gaika Riley, 1938
Pseudonympha paludis Riley, 1938
Pseudonympha penningtoni Riley, 1938
Pseudonympha machacha Riley, 1938
Paternympha narycia (Wallengren, 1857)
Stygionympha vigilans (Trimen & Bowker, 1887)
Stygionympha scotina Quickelberge, 1977
Stygionympha wichgrafi williami Henning & Henning, 1996
Serradinga bowkeri (Trimen, 1870)
Torynesis pringlei Dickson, 1979

Nymphalinae

Nymphalini
Vanessa cardui (Linnaeus, 1758)
Junonia hierta cebrene Trimen, 1870
Junonia oenone (Linnaeus, 1758)
Junonia orithya madagascariensis Guenée, 1865
Hypolimnas misippus (Linnaeus, 1764)

Biblidinae

Biblidini
Byblia ilithyia (Drury, 1773)

Heliconiinae

Acraeini
Acraea horta (Linnaeus, 1764)
Acraea neobule Doubleday, 1847
Acraea lygus Druce, 1875
Acraea anacreon Trimen, 1868

Vagrantini
Phalanta phalantha aethiopica (Rothschild & Jordan, 1903)

Hesperiidae

Coeliadinae
Coeliades forestan (Stoll, [1782])
Coeliades pisistratus (Fabricius, 1793)

Pyrginae

Carcharodini
Spialia agylla (Trimen & Bowker, 1889)
Spialia asterodia (Trimen, 1864)
Spialia diomus ferax (Wallengren, 1863)
Spialia mafa (Trimen, 1870)
Spialia spio (Linnaeus, 1764)

Hesperiinae

Aeromachini
Kedestes barberae (Trimen, 1873)
Kedestes niveostriga (Trimen, 1864)

Baorini
Gegenes niso (Linnaeus, 1764)

Heteropterinae
Metisella aegipan (Trimen, 1868)
Metisella malgacha orina Vári, 1976
Metisella syrinx (Trimen, 1868)
Tsitana tsita (Trimen, 1870)

See also
Geography of Lesotho

References

Seitz, A. Die Gross-Schmetterlinge der Erde 13: Die Afrikanischen Tagfalter. Plates
Seitz, A. Die Gross-Schmetterlinge der Erde 13: Die Afrikanischen Tagfalter. Text (in German)

B

Butterflies
Lesotho
Lesotho